The Valgjärve TV Mast is a 347 m high guyed mast in Southern Estonia. It is located in Pikareinu village in Valgjärve Parish, Põlva County and was built in 1988. Valgjärve TV Mast is the second tallest structure in Estonia after Koeru TV Mast.

References

External links
 

Towers completed in 1988
Communication towers in Estonia
Buildings and structures in Põlva County
Guyed masts
Kanepi Parish
1988 establishments in Estonia